Relentless Retribution is the sixth studio album by American thrash metal band Death Angel. The album was released September 3, 2010, in Europe (but not including the United Kingdom), on September 6 in the United Kingdom, and on September 14 in the United States. Its second track "Claws in So Deep" features an acoustic part performed by Rodrigo y Gabriela. This is Death Angel's first album with bassist Damien Sisson and drummer Will Carroll (replacing original members Dennis Pepa and Andy Galeon respectively), and their first collaboration with Jason Suecof, who has since produced the band's subsequent albums. The album sold 2,700 copies in its first week in the U.S.

Track listing

Personnel 
Death Angel
Mark Osegueda − lead vocals
Rob Cavestany − lead guitar, lead vocals on "Volcanic", co-lead vocals on "Claws in So Deep", backing vocals
Ted Aguilar − rhythm guitar, harmony guitar on "Claws in So Deep"
Damien Sisson − bass
Will Carroll − drums

Additional musicians
Jason Suecof − guitar solos on "Truce"
Rodrigo y Gabriela − acoustic guitar outro on "Claws in So Deep"

Charts

References 

2010 albums
Death Angel albums
Nuclear Blast albums
Albums produced by Jason Suecof